Kung Fu Panda: The Paws of Destiny is an American computer-animated streaming television series produced by DreamWorks Animation Television and premiered its first "part" on Amazon Prime Video on November 16, 2018. The second and final part was released on July 5, 2019. It is the second television series in the Kung Fu Panda franchise following Kung Fu Panda: Legends of Awesomeness. Developer Mitch Watson has confirmed that Mick Wingert would reprise his role from Legends of Awesomeness as Po.

Plot
Set after the events of Kung Fu Panda 3 (2016), the series follows Po the panda on a fresh adventure featuring four panda kids (Nu Hai, Jing, Bao, and Fan Tong); who happen upon a mystical cave beneath the Panda Village. The panda kids accidentally absorb the chi of ancient and powerful Kung Fu warriors known as the four constellations; Blue Dragon, Black Tortoise, White Tiger and Red Phoenix – each of which somehow are with the panda; who has a quality opposite to that constellation's prime quality. They realize they are now destined to save the world from an evil force (Jindiao); who wishes to take over the world and steal the chi of the four constellations, landing Po with his biggest challenge yet – teaching this ragtag band of kids how to wield their new-found Kung Fu powers. They also defend the Forbidden City against an evil Komodo dragon named Shi Long alongside with an ancient evil demon.

Voice cast

Episodes

Part 1 (2018)

Part 2 (2019)

Awards and nominations

References

External links
 

2018 American television series debuts
2019 American television series endings
2010s American animated television series
American computer-animated television series
Amazon Prime Video children's programming
American children's animated comedy television series
American children's animated action television series
American children's animated fantasy television series
Television series by DreamWorks Animation
Television series by Universal Television
Kung Fu Panda television series
Animated television shows based on films
Martial arts television series
Television series about pandas
Anime-influenced Western animated television series
English-language television shows